"Swings & Waterslides" is a song performed by English indie rock group Viola Beach. The song was released as a digital download on 27 August 2015 through Fuller Beans Records. The song peaked at number 11 on the UK Singles Chart after the four band members and their manager Craig Tarry were killed in an incident on the E4 motorway bridge at Södertälje, southwest of Stockholm, Sweden on 13 February 2016. The song is included on their posthumous debut studio album, Viola Beach. The song was written by Viola Beach and produced by Sugar House.

Track listing

Charts

Release history

Release history

References

2015 songs
Viola Beach songs